The 2016 Shannons Nationals Motor Racing Championships season is the eleventh running of the Shannons Nationals Motor Racing Championships. The season started on 1 April at Sandown Raceway and will finish on 13 November at Sydney Motorsport Park.

Twelve different series will be a part of the Championships in 2016: the Australian Endurance Championship, Australian GT Trophy Series, Touring Car Masters, Porsche GT3 Cup Challenge Australia, Kumho Tyres V8 Touring Cars, Kerrick Sports Sedan Series, Radical Australia Cup, Australian Formula 3 Championship, Australian Formula 4 Championship, Australian Formula Ford Series, Australian Production Car Series, Australian Superkart Championship and Australian Sports Racer Series.

Calendar

References

Shannons Nationals